Nikolay Kiselyov may refer to:

 Nikolay Kiselyov (soldier) (1913–1974), Russian soldier, prisoner of war and partisan leader during World War II
 Nikolay Kiselyov (athlete) (1939–2005), Russian Nordic combined skier, silver medalist at the 1964 Winter Olympics
 Nikolay Kiselyov (footballer) (born 1946), Russian football player and manager
 Nikolay Kiselyov (politician) (born 1950), Russian politician, former Governor of the Arkhangelsk Oblast
 Nikolay Kiselev (politician) (1903–1983), Soviet politician
 Nikolai Dmitrievich Kiselev (1802-1869), Russian diplomat and Privy Councilor